Sanglekhola साङ्लेखोला is  located in the north part of Kathmandu District, in Kathmandu Valley, Bagmati Province of Nepal.  In ancient time, this place was ruled by the Paglu dynasty and its last king, Kiranaditya KC, after the revolution, was exiled from the country and took refuge in Sammonkatu.

Populated places in Kathmandu District